Marko Šarlija (born 31 January 1982 in Zagreb), is a Croatian football goalkeeper who last played for NK Sesvete.

Playing career
Šarlija started out at local club Dinamo Zagreb.  He made eight appearances in the Prva HNL during this stint, and spent the 2002–2003 season on loan at NK Zadar, making 23 appearances.  He also made 23 appearances over two spells at Inter Zaprešić before moving, in 2008, to FK Baku. Now he play for Ethnikos Achna

He was also a member of the Croatian squad for the 2004 UEFA European Under-21 Football Championship

Honours
FK Baku
Azerbaijan Cup: 2012

References

External links
 

1982 births
Living people
Footballers from Zagreb
Association football goalkeepers
Croatian footballers
Croatia youth international footballers
Croatia under-21 international footballers
GNK Dinamo Zagreb players
NK Zadar players
NK Inter Zaprešić players
FC Baku players
Ethnikos Achna FC players
NK Lokomotiva Zagreb players
NK Sesvete players
Croatian Football League players
Azerbaijan Premier League players
Cypriot First Division players
First Football League (Croatia) players
Croatian expatriate footballers
Expatriate footballers in Azerbaijan
Croatian expatriate sportspeople in Azerbaijan
Expatriate footballers in Cyprus
Croatian expatriate sportspeople in Cyprus